Robbie Hucker (born 13 March 1990) is an Australian professional racing cyclist, who most recently rode for UCI Continental team .

Major results

2013
 10th Overall Tour of Japan
2016
 1st Overall Tour de Taiwan
1st Stage 5
 7th Overall Herald Sun Tour
2017
 2nd Sun Hung Kai Properties Hong Kong Challenge
 8th Road race, National Road Championships
 10th Overall Tour of Hainan
2018
 1st Stage 2 Tour de Taiwan
 4th Overall Tour de Tochigi
1st Mountains classification
 10th Japan Cup
2019
 1st Overall Tour de Ijen

References

External links

1990 births
Living people
Australian male cyclists
Place of birth missing (living people)